Davis City is a city in Decatur County, Iowa, United States. The population was 179 at the time of the 2020 census.

History
Davis City was laid out in 1855. It is named for William Davis, who operated a sawmill. Davis City was a shipping point on the Chicago, Burlington and Quincy Railroad.

Geography
Davis City is located at  (40.639501, -93.812137) along the Thompson River. A stream gauge station is maintained on the river in the city.

Demographics

2010 census
At the 2010 census there were 204 people in 94 households, including 53 families, in the city. The racial makup of the city was 98.0% White, 0.5% Native American, and 1.5% from two or more races. Hispanic or Latino of any race were 1.0%.

Of the 94 households 21.3% had children under the age of 18 living with them, 44.7% were married couples living together, 6.4% had a female householder with no husband present, 5.3% had a male householder with no wife present, and 43.6% were non-families. 36.2% of households were one person and 17% were one person aged 65 or older. The average household size was 2.12 and the average family size was 2.72.

The median age was 52 years. 18.1% of residents were under the age of 18; 6.9% were between the ages of 18 and 24; 17.2% were from 25 to 44; 28.4% were from 45 to 64; and 29.4% were 65 or older. The gender makeup of the city was 48.5% male and 51.5% female.

2000 census
At the 2000 census there were 275 people in 109 households, including 79 families, in the city. The racial makup of the city was 98.55% White, 0.36% Native American, 0.73% from other races, and 0.36% from two or more races. Hispanic or Latino of any race were 1.45%.

Of the 109 households 33.9% had children under the age of 18 living with them, 54.1% were married couples living together, 11.0% had a female householder with no husband present, and 27.5% were non-families. 24.8% of households were one person and 10.1% were one person aged 65 or older. The average household size was 2.46 and the average family size was 2.86.

The age distribution was 27.6% under the age of 18, 5.8% from 18 to 24, 25.5% from 25 to 44, 24.0% from 45 to 64, and 17.1% 65 or older. The median age was 39 years. For every 100 females, there were 99.3 males. For every 100 females age 18 and over, there were 95.1 males.

The median household income was $23,750 and the median family income  was $26,875. Males had a median income of $25,750 versus $19,250 for females. The per capita income for the city was $10,091. About 25.6% of families and 28.6% of the population were below the poverty line, including 30.4% of those under the age of eighteen and 23.1% of those sixty five or over.

Education
The Central Decatur Community School District operates local area public schools.

References

Cities in Iowa
Cities in Decatur County, Iowa